Quekettia is a small genus of orchids classified in the subtribe Oncidiinae. This genus is found in the humid lowlands of Brazil, the Guianas, Venezuela, Ecuador and Trinidad.

The trade of these orchids is controlled to avoid use incompatible with species survival 

The name commemorates the author and microscopist Edwin John Quekett.

Species
Species accepted as of June 2014:

 Quekettia microscopica Lindl. (French Guiana, Guyana, Suriname, Venezuela, NE Brazil) 
 Quekettia papillosa Garay (Suriname, Pará)
 Quekettia pygmaea (Cogn.) Garay & R.E.Schult. (Venezuela, Ecuador, Brazil, Trinidad)
 Quekettia vermeuleniana Determann (Suriname)

formerly included
moved to: Capanemia 
 Q. australis - Capanemia micromera 
 Q. carinata - Capanemia carinata  
 Q. duseniana - Capanemia theresae  
 Q. longirostellata - Capanemia theresae  
 Q. micromera - Capanemia micromera  
 Q. theresae - Capanemia theresae

References

External links
 
 

Oncidiinae
Orchids of Brazil
Orchids of Ecuador
Orchids of Guyana
Orchids of Trinidad
Orchids of Venezuela
Oncidiinae genera